, real name , is an author and video game developer. He co-authored Samurai Crusader with Ryoichi Ikegami. He also created the Far East of Eden and Sakura Wars role-playing video game franchises, and wrote the Sakura Wars manga.

Original creations

Diamond Daydreams
Far East of Eden
Karasuma Kyoko no Jikenbo
Kuso Kagaku Sekai Gulliver Boy
Mashin Hero Wataru
Madō King Granzort
Madō King Granzort: Bōken-hen
Madō King Granzort: The Final Magical Battle
Moeyo Ken (OVA)
Moeyo Ken anime series
Sakura Taisen (manga)
Sakura Taisen: Ecole de Paris
Sakura Taisen: Le Nouveau Paris
Sakura Taisen: Sumire
Sakura Wars (OVA)
Sakura Wars
Sakura Wars 2
Sakura Wars: The Movie
Sora to Umi no Aida
Takt Op.
Virgin Fleet

References

(August 1, 2000) "Ask Hiroi Oji."  Mainichi Broadcasting System. Accessed November 2011.

External links
 Oji Hiroi manga and anime at Media Arts Database 
 

 
Living people
1954 births